Yiannakis Omirou (born 18 September 1951) is a Greek-Cypriot politician. He was president of the Cypriot parliament from 2011 to 2016 and was leader of political party EDEK between 2001 and 2015.

Omirou was born in Paphos and studied law at the National and Kapodistrian University of Athens. He was an active member of the resistance movement against the 1974 coup. He is single and speaks English fluently.

References

|-

1951 births
Living people
People from Paphos
Greek Cypriot people
Presidents of the House of Representatives (Cyprus)
Movement for Social Democracy politicians
Leaders of political parties in Cyprus
20th-century Cypriot lawyers